This list of supertall structures is a third part of the List of tallest structures in the world.

Other parts are:

 List of tallest structures
 List of tallest structures – 400 to 500 metres

See the first part for terminology and general introduction.

For terminology and notes see the first part of the list.

For practical purposes to keep the list to a reasonable length, this part of the list contains only notable structures.

Please correct (by adding further one or by putting completed structures in the upper table, if current height is over ).

See also
 List of tallest structures in the world
 List of cities with most skyscrapers

References

External links
 Skyscrapers database
 Search for Radio Masts and Towers in the U.S.
 Skyscrapers diagrams and forum

300 to 400 metres
Towers
Guyed masts
Lists of construction records